Saints and Sinners may refer to:

Film and television
 Saints and Sinners (1916 film), a 1916 American film directed by James Kirkwood
 Saints and Sinners (1949 film), a 1949 film directed by Leslie Arliss
 Saints and Sinners (1994 film), starring Damian Chapa
 Saints and Sinners (1962 TV series), starring Nick Adams
 Saints & Sinners (2007 TV series), a MyNetworkTV telenovela
 Santos y pecadores (in Spanish, "Saints and sinners"), a 2013 Argentine miniseries
 Saints & Sinners (2016 TV series), a 2016 American television series

Literature
 Saints and Sinners (short story collection), by Edna O'Brien
 Saints and Sinners Literary Festival, a literary festival, specializing in LGBT literature, held in New Orleans, Louisiana
 Saints and Sinners, an 1884 play by Henry Arthur Jones

Music
 Saints & Sinners Festival, a hardcore and heavy metal music festival held in New Jersey

Albums
 Saints & Sinners (All Saints album)
 Saints & Sinners (Johnny Winter album)
 Saints & Sinners (Saints & Sinners album)
 Saints & Sinners (Whitesnake album)
 Saints and Sinners (Matt Maher album)
 Saints and Sinners (Kane Roberts album)
 Saint or Sinner, by Aggro Santos

Bands
 Saints & Sinners (jazz band), a jazz ensemble
 Saints & Sinners (heavy metal band), a Canadian hair metal band
 Saints or Sinners, former name of American rock band the Scream

Songs
 "Saints and Sinners" (song), by Godsmack on the album The Oracle
 "Saints and Sinners", by Arch Enemy from Anthems of Rebellion
 "Saints and Sinners", by Flogging Molly from Speed of Darkness
 "Saints & Sinners", by Bullet for my Valentine from Temper Temper
 "Saints & Sinners" (Paddy Casey song), 2003

Other uses
 The Walking Dead: Saints & Sinners, a virtual reality video game

See also
 Saint Sinner (disambiguation)
 Sinners and Saints (disambiguation)